Sunnylven is a former municipality in Møre og Romsdal county, Norway. The  municipality existed from 1838 until its dissolution in 1965. Since that time, it has made up the southern part of the present-day Stranda Municipality.  It encompassed the areas around the Sunnylvsfjorden and Geirangerfjorden.  The village of Hellesylt was the administrative centre of the municipality and Geiranger was the other main population centre in Sunnylven.  The main church for the municipality was Sunnylven Church in Hellesylt.

History
The municipality of Sunnylven was established on 1 January 1838 (see formannskapsdistrikt law). According to the 1835 census, Sunnylven had a population of 1,476. During the 1960s, there were many municipal mergers across Norway due to the work of the Schei Committee. On 1 January 1965, the two neighboring municipalities of Sunnylven (population: 1,221) and Stranda (population: 3,453) were merged into one large Stranda Municipality.

Government
All municipalities in Norway, including Sunnylven, are responsible for primary education (through 10th grade), outpatient health services, senior citizen services, unemployment and other social services, zoning, economic development, and municipal roads.  The municipality is governed by a municipal council of elected representatives, which in turn elects a mayor.

Municipal council
The municipal council  of Sunnylven was made up of 17 representatives that were elected to four year terms.  The party breakdown of the final municipal council was as follows:

See also
List of former municipalities of Norway

References

Stranda
Sunnmøre
Former municipalities of Norway
1838 establishments in Norway
1965 disestablishments in Norway